Jan van Hulst (18 December 1903 – 1 August 1975, Amersfoort) was a Dutch engineer who was active in the Dutch resistance during the Second World War. He was instrumental in preventing Jews from being deported and killed during the Holocaust, and is recognized as Righteous Among the Nations.

First actions
Van Hulst first became involved in this work when the parents of his Jewish wife, Paula, were arrested along with her aunt and held in Amsterdam as a temporary way station before being deported to a Nazi concentration camp in German-occupied Poland.  Van Hulst convinced the Germans in command that his mother-in-law was a Belgian Catholic who had been expelled from Belgium to the Netherlands when World War I broke out, due to her husband having an Austrian passport. Van Hulst claimed that she had been accidentally registered as Jewish when she was granted Dutch citizenship. To convince the German commanders of his loyalty, he praised their efforts to deport Jews, but warned them against being overzealous and deporting non-Jews by mistake. When his mother-in-law confirmed his account, she and her husband (at that time, Jews with Gentile spouses were exempt from deportation) were released. In addition, this protected her relatives, and Paula van Hulst—now registered as a "half-Jew" married to a Gentile—was exempt from deportation.

Falsification strategies
Van Hulst's involvement in preventing the deportation of Jews continued, providing them with shelter in his own house, and by falsifying identification papers for them, or using the expertise of the anthropologist Arie de Froe to call into question their racial background. Van Hulst presented this spurious evidence at the German government compound once or twice a week, wearing the long coat and wide-brimmed hat typically worn by Gestapo agents or Dutch collaborators. By presenting this evidence, Van Hulst would be then able to initiate an investigation into that Jew's racial background, delaying their deportation. For this falsification to remain convincing, Van Hulst occasionally let a Jew's actual identity be revealed, having previously made certain the person was hidden and safe from deportation.

The example of Emmy Elffers
One example of the sometimes complicated process needed to falsify identification papers involved Emmy Elffers, a photographer. To do this required falsified records to make it appear that her Jewish  father was not her biological father. To achieve that, Van Hulst went to a doctor known for saving all his records, convinced him to show him his files, and stole the file containing Elffers’ father's medical records. Dick Elffers, Emmy's husband and an artist, forged records to show that Elffers’ father was unable to have children due to a severe case of the mumps. Disguised as a gas inspector, Van Hulst then returned the file to its place.

To also prove that Elffers' father was non-Jewish, Van Hulst went to Venlo and stole a ledger from a hotel there, modifying it to show that Elffers’ mother and a man with an obviously non-Jewish name had registered for a room forty years and nine months before. When Van Hulst found someone who agreed to identify himself as that man, Elffers was declared half-Jewish and was no longer in danger of deportation.

Decoy hideout
To conceal people in his house, he smuggled in fourteen square meters of bricks, mortar, and boards,  and built a second wall in the attic. He also built a decoy hideout, designed to be possible to find, but hidden well enough to be convincing. It contained chocolate, cognac, and cigarettes to distract searchers, as well as forged papers that would cost officials time investigating false information.

House raid
During the Dutch famine of 1944, Paula van Hulst was hospitalized with a serious chronic kidney disease. In January 1945, Van Hulst learned that a Jewish colleague, Harry Romp, had been arrested. Van Hulst successfully recovered Romp's radio transmitter (used for contacting London) and brought it to his house, but he was seen and followed. On January 29, 1945, when Van Hulst was visiting his wife at the hospital, his house was raided by a soldier and a Dutch collaborator searching for the radio transmitter. His daughter Hannah (aged twelve in 1945) later described the incident:

The Dutch collaborator became suspicious about the large amount of food being cooked, and asked Hannah where her parents were, which she did not answer clearly. After locking her and her sister Myriam in the study, the soldier and collaborator searched the house, looking primarily for the radio transmitter. The two sisters attracted the attention of a passing neighbor and signaled him to warn Van Hulst by holding up two sheets of paper with "Warn Papa" written on them. However, the neighbor did not know Van Hulst's whereabouts. When Van Hulst's youngest daughter, Alexandria, returned home, she went to the passing neighbor's house and told him that Van Hulst was visiting his wife at the hospital, making it possible for the neighbor to contact and warn him. The false papers were found and had their intended effect by providing the searchers with misleading information. Following this incident, Van Hulst went into hiding, but emerged to attend his wife's funeral in February of that year.

Post-war activity
Following World War II, Van Hulst returned to his previous engineering employment and refused honors for his wartime work. According to Rudy Reisel, one of his associates who later moved to Israel, he said, "I did not do what I did in order to have my name remembered. My work was an obligation in those days." Van Hulst was posthumously granted the title of Righteous Among the Nations by the Israeli organization Yad Vashem in 1997.

References 

 The Righteous Among the Nations: Rescuers of Jews During the Holocaust, by Mordecai Paldiel. New York, 2007.

External links 
Jan van Hulst – his activity to save Jews' lives during the Holocaust, at Yad Vashem website
List of Righteous Among the Nations from the Netherlands

1903 births
1975 deaths
Dutch resistance members
20th-century Dutch engineers
People from Amstelveen
Dutch Righteous Among the Nations